Lanz Peak is a peak,  high, near the extreme northern end of the Sentinel Range in the Ellsworth Mountains of Antarctica. The peak was discovered by Lincoln Ellsworth on his trans-Antarctic flight of November 23, 1935, and was named by the Advisory Committee on Antarctic Names for Walter J. Lanz, a radio operator on three Ellsworth Antarctic expeditions between 1933 and 1936.

See also
 Mountains in Antarctica

References

Ellsworth Mountains
Mountains of Ellsworth Land